The Brazil women's national rugby sevens team has appeared in the Olympics, the Rugby World Cup, the Women's Sevens Series, and other competitions. Brazil has won every regional championship in South America. Their team nickname "Yara" was coined in 2013, and comes from the local Tupí-Guaraní mythology. It was meant to signify the courage and collective strength of women’s rugby in Brazil and also to connect them with their country’s roots.

They qualified for the Tokyo Olympics after defeating Colombia in the finals of the 2019 Sudamérica Rugby Women's Sevens Olympic Qualifying Tournament. Brazil and Colombia qualified for the 2022 Rugby World Cup Sevens in South Africa.

Tournament history

Summer Olympics

Rugby World Cup Sevens

Pan American Games

South American Games

World Rugby Women's Sevens Series

IRB Women's Sevens Challenge Cup

Sudamérica Rugby Women's Sevens

Team

Olympics squads

Brazil's roster of 12 athletes was named on 28 June 2021.

Head coach: Will Broderick

Luiza Campos
Isadora Cerullo
Thalia Costa
Thalita Costa
Marina Fioravanti
Aline Furtado
Raquel Kochhann (c)
Mariana Nicolau
Haline Scatrut
Bianca Silva
Leila Cássia Silva
Rafaela Zanellato

Previous squads

See also
Brazil national rugby sevens team

References

External links
Official website
WorldRugby profile

Women's national rugby sevens teams
Rugby sevens in Brazil
R
Brazil national rugby union team